John R. Graham was an English professional footballer who played as a forward.

Career
Born in Newcastle, Graham played for Newcastle United and Bradford City. For Bradford City, he made 54 appearances in the Football League; he also made 5 FA Cup appearances.

Sources

References

Year of birth missing
Year of death missing
English footballers
Newcastle United F.C. players
Bradford City A.F.C. players
English Football League players
Association football forwards